Kwatsi Bay is a bay on the North American mainland of British Columbia, Canada. It is just north of Gilford Island on the north side of Tribune Channel. At the head of the bay  was its namesake, kwatsi, a former village of the Kwicksutaineuk group of the Kwakwaka'wakw peoples.

It is a popular destination for pleasure boaters.

References

External links 
Map of the area, Fisheries and Oceans Canada - Pacific Region.

Bays of British Columbia
Central Coast of British Columbia